Ernest Evar Swanson (October 15, 1902 in DeKalb, Illinois – July 17, 1973 in Galesburg, Illinois), was a professional baseball and football player. He would play for the Cincinnati Reds and Chicago White Sox. In the National Football League, he played running back for the Rock Island Independents, Milwaukee Badgers, and Chicago Cardinals from 1924 to 1927. He went to college and played three sports at Lombard College in Galesburg, Illinois.

Swanson was one of the fastest men in baseball in his time. During a contest held on September 15, 1929 between games of a doubleheader, he circled the bases in 13.3 seconds and that record still stands. (Some sources claim his time was 13.4.) A year later, on September 21, 1930, in a minor league field meet in Columbus, Ohio, Swanson circled the bases in 13.2 seconds, giving him both the fastest time as a minor leaguer.

References

External links

Football-Reference.com

1902 births
1973 deaths
Major League Baseball outfielders
Baseball players from Illinois
American football running backs
Chicago White Sox players
Cincinnati Reds players
Chicago Cardinals players
Milwaukee Badgers players
Rock Island Independents players
American people of Swedish descent
Players of American football from Illinois
People from DeKalb, Illinois
Lombard College alumni